Rabbit pie is a game pie consisting  of rabbit meat in a gravy with other ingredients (typically onions, celery and carrots) enclosed in a pastry crust.  Rabbit pie is part of traditional American and English cuisine.  It has recently found renewed popularity.

Ingredients
Wild rabbit, as opposed to farmed, is most often used as it is easily and affordably obtained, and is described as more flavoursome.

Along with rabbit meat, ingredients of the filling of a rabbit pie typically include onions, celery and carrots. Other ingredients may include prunes, bacon and cider.
Australian recipes for rabbit pie sometimes include the food paste Vegemite as an ingredient.

In culture
Rabbit pie was a staple dish of the American pioneers. Thanks to the increasing demand for wild and fresh ingredients, rabbit pie is often seen on the menus of fashionable restaurants and gastropubs.

Two huge rabbit pies are part of traditional Easter celebrations in the English village of Hallaton, Leicestershire.

In Beatrix Potter's children's book  The Tale of Peter Rabbit, Peter Rabbit and his siblings are warned "[not to] go into Mr. McGregor's garden" because their father "had an accident there; he was put in a pie by Mrs. McGregor."

"Rabbit pie day" is ostensibly invoked in the song Run Rabbit Run.

See also

 Jugged hare
 List of pies, tarts and flans
 Meat pie

References

Savoury pies
Pie
American pies
British pies